Antoine Hey (born 19 September 1970) is a German football coach and former professional player. He has been head coach of Myanmar since October 2019.

He spent most of his playing career in the top two divisions of German football, and went on to manage a number of national teams.

Playing career 
Hey played mainly for Fortuna Düsseldorf and Schalke 04 in Germany, as well as Tennis Borussia Berlin, Fortuna Köln, VfL Osnabrück, Anorthosis Famagusta and VfR Neumünster.

Managerial career 
Hey began his management career in Germany with VfR Neumünster before moving to Africa to manage Lesotho. Hey was also manager of the Gambia from September 2006 until March 2007. His spell with Gambia was marred by concerns over money. He was appointed manager of Liberia in February 2008. In February 2009, he was appointed coach of the Kenyan national team. After disputes with the governing body over team selection, Hey walked out on Kenya's national team shortly before the final World Cup qualifier against Nigeria.

Later on, he worked as a Technical Director for the Libyan Football Federation from 2010 until 2014, and in the same role for the Bahrain Football Association from 2015 until 2016. In November 2016, Hey returned to management with Sudanese club Al-Merrikh, but he was sacked in January 2017 due to poor results, directly after the draw with ASAS Djibouti Télécom in the 2017 UAFA Club Championship.

In February 2017 he was one of a number of managers on the shortlist for the vacant Rwanda national team manager role. He was appointed manager of the Rwanda national team in March 2017. He asked to quit in January 2018.

In May 2018, he was appointed in a dual role as manager of Myanmar and its under-23 team on a one-and-half-year deal. In the 2018 AFF Championship, Myanmar drew with Vietnam under controversial circumstances. Hey was criticized for his aggressive behaviour in this match towards the Vietnamese players and their manager Park Hang-seo. He was sacked in December 2018. He returned to Myanmar in October 2019.

Personal life 
His father, Jonny Hey, was also a professional footballer, playing for MSV Duisburg, Arminia Bielefeld, Grasshoppers Zürich and Fortuna Köln between 1972 and 1980.

References

External links 
 
 
 Antoine Hey Interview

1970 births
Living people
Footballers from Berlin
German footballers
Association football midfielders
Grasshopper Club Zürich players
Fortuna Düsseldorf players
FC Schalke 04 players
Tennis Borussia Berlin players
SC Fortuna Köln players
Birmingham City F.C. players
VfL Osnabrück players
Anorthosis Famagusta F.C. players
Bristol City F.C. players
VfR Neumünster players
Bundesliga players
2. Bundesliga players
Regionalliga players
English Football League players
Cypriot First Division players
German expatriate footballers
German expatriate sportspeople in Switzerland
German expatriate sportspeople in England
German expatriate sportspeople in Cyprus
Expatriate footballers in Switzerland
Expatriate footballers in England
Expatriate footballers in Cyprus
German football managers
VfR Neumünster managers
Lesotho national football team managers
Gambia national football team managers
US Monastir (football) managers
Liberia national football team managers
Kenya national football team managers
Al-Merrikh SC managers
Rwanda national football team managers
Myanmar national football team managers
Regionalliga managers
Tunisian Ligue Professionnelle 1 managers
Sudan Premier League managers
German expatriate football managers
German expatriate sportspeople in Lesotho
German expatriate sportspeople in the Gambia
German expatriate sportspeople in Tunisia
German expatriate sportspeople in Liberia
German expatriate sportspeople in Kenya
German expatriate sportspeople in Sudan
German expatriate sportspeople in Rwanda
German expatriate sportspeople in Myanmar
Expatriate football managers in Lesotho
Expatriate football managers in the Gambia
Expatriate football managers in Tunisia
Expatriate football managers in Liberia
Expatriate football managers in Kenya
Expatriate football managers in Sudan
Expatriate football managers in Rwanda
Expatriate football managers in Myanmar
West German footballers